Duchess of Norfolk is a title held by the wife of the duke of Norfolk in the peerage of England. The duke of Norfolk is the premier duke in the peerage of England, and also, as earl of Arundel, the premier earl. The first creation was in 1397.

Duchesses of Norfolk
1st creation (1397)
Margaret, Duchess of Norfolk, in her own right.
Elizabeth Fitzalan, Duchess of Norfolk, wife of Thomas de Mowbray, 1st Duke of Norfolk
Katherine Neville, Duchess of Norfolk, wife of John de Mowbray, 2nd Duke of Norfolk
Lady Eleanor Bourchier, wife of John de Mowbray, 3rd Duke of Norfolk
Elizabeth Talbot, Duchess of Norfolk, wife of John de Mowbray, 4th Duke of Norfolk

2nd creation (1477)
Anne de Mowbray, 8th Countess of Norfolk, wife of Richard of Shrewsbury, Duke of York (and Duke of Norfolk)

3rd creation (1483)
Agnes Howard, Duchess of Norfolk, 2nd wife of Thomas Howard, 2nd Duke of Norfolk
Elizabeth Stafford, Duchess of Norfolk, wife of Thomas Howard, 3rd Duke of Norfolk
Mary Fitzalan, 1st wife of Thomas Howard, 4th Duke of Norfolk
Margaret Audley, Duchess of Norfolk, 2nd wife of Thomas Howard, 4th Duke of Norfolk
Elizabeth Leyburne, 3rd wife of Thomas Howard, 4th Duke of Norfolk
Jane Howard, Duchess of Norfolk (née Jane Bickerton), wife of Henry Howard, 6th Duke of Norfolk
Mary Howard, Duchess of Norfolk (died 1705) (Mary Mordaunt, 7th Baroness Mordaunt), wife of Henry Howard, 7th Duke of Norfolk
Maria Howard, Duchess of Norfolk (née Maria Shireburn), wife of Thomas Howard, 8th Duke of Norfolk
Mary Howard, Duchess of Norfolk (died 1773) (née Mary Blount), wife of Edward Howard, 9th Duke of Norfolk
Catherine Brockholes, wife of Charles Howard, 10th Duke of Norfolk
Frances Scudamore, Duchess of Norfolk, wife of Charles Howard, 11th Duke of Norfolk
Charlotte Fitzalan-Howard, Duchess of Norfolk (née Charlotte Leveson-Gower), wife of Henry Howard, 13th Duke of Norfolk
Augusta Fitzalan-Howard, Duchess of Norfolk (née Augusta Lyons), wife of Henry Fitzalan-Howard, 14th Duke of Norfolk
Flora Fitzalan-Howard, Duchess of Norfolk, (née Abney-Hastings), 1st wife of Henry Fitzalan-Howard, 15th Duke of Norfolk
Gwendolen Fitzalan-Howard, Duchess of Norfolk (Gwendolen Constable-Maxwell, 12th Lady Herries of Terregles), 2nd wife of Henry Fitzalan-Howard, 15th Duke of Norfolk
Lavinia Fitzalan-Howard, Duchess of Norfolk (née Lavinia Strutt), wife of Bernard Fitzalan-Howard, 16th Duke of Norfolk
Anne Fitzalan-Howard, Duchess of Norfolk (née Anne Constable-Maxwell), wife of Miles Fitzalan-Howard, 17th Duke of Norfolk
Georgina Fitzalan-Howard, Duchess of Norfolk (née Georgina Gore), wife of Edward William Fitzalan-Howard, 18th Duke of Norfolk